The LiederNet Archive (formerly The Lied, Art Song, and Choral Texts Archive) is a donation-supported web archive of art song and choral texts founded in 1995 by Emily Ezust, an American/Canadian computer programmer and amateur violinist. The website was hosted by the REC Music Foundation from 1996 to 2015.

The LiederNet Archive provides access to both original out-of-copyright song texts and copyright-protected translations submitted by over 500 volunteer translators. The website is indexed by composer, text poet or author, first line, title, or language.

The LiederNet Archive is frequently cited as a source in musical studies, where the website's aggregate listings of settings of songs and poems may be more complete or more easily accessible than conventional musicological resources.

References

Online music and lyrics databases
Lieder
Internet properties established in 1995
Canadian music websites